Samuel R. Demarest House is located in Demarest, Bergen County, New Jersey, United States. The house was built in 1817 and was added to the National Register of Historic Places on July 24, 1984.

See also
National Register of Historic Places listings in Bergen County, New Jersey

References

Demarest, New Jersey
Houses on the National Register of Historic Places in New Jersey
Houses completed in 1817
Houses in Bergen County, New Jersey
National Register of Historic Places in Bergen County, New Jersey
New Jersey Register of Historic Places
1817 establishments in New Jersey